An Australian Football League team song is traditionally sung by members of the winning team after an AFL game. It is played when each team runs out onto the field prior to the beginning of the match, and played for the winning team at the end of the match.

The first team song was the Collingwood song "Good Old Collingwood Forever", written by player Tom Nelson in 1906 to the tune of "Goodbye, Dolly Gray", an American music hall song. Other clubs have continued to rewrite other songs' lyrics to suit their team, with four of the 18 team songs having both original lyrics and music.

Notes
 The Fitzroy team song was compiled by Bill Stephen in 1952 on a train to Perth during a football trip. Bill Stephen wrote the first line of the song after which each other player wrote a line. It is to the tune of the French National Anthem, "La Marseillaise" and was adopted by Brisbane in 1997.
 The Western Bulldogs team song was originally called "Sons of the 'Scray" before Footscray changed their name to the Western Bulldogs in 1997, with the song's lyrics being slightly altered to "Sons of the West".
 The South Melbourne Swans' club song was identical to the current Sydney club song, with the lyric "South will go in and win over all" being changed to "Swans will go in..." when the club moved to Sydney. In fact, until 2021 Sydney Swans used the same 1972 recording by The Fable Singers, with "South" being re-dubbed as "Swans". In 2021 the club re-recorded the song, with the lyric "While her loyal sons are marching" also being changed to "While our loyal Swans are marching".
 The Fremantle Dockers' club song used from 1995 until 2011 contained a section based on "The Song of the Volga Boatmen", a Russian folk song, but most of the song was an original composition by Ken Walther. After the 2011 season, the "Volga Boatmen" section was dropped, leaving only the part written by Walther.
The West Coast Eagles song was rerecorded by Birds of Tokyo in February 2020. The song sticks with the chorus most fans will recognise, sticking with We're Flying High, but it now contains a couple of verses as well as a didgeridoo intro performed by indigenous musician Matthew Doyle, the first AFL song to contain it.

References

Team songs
 
Australian rules football-related lists